The Fish class of Admiralty trawlers was a small class of naval trawlers built for the British Royal Navy during the Second World War.

The vessels were intended for use as minesweepers and for anti-submarine warfare, and the design was based on a commercial type, the 1929 Gulfoss by Cochrane & Sons, of Selby. The purpose of the order was to make use of specialist mercantile shipyards to provide vessels for war use by adapting commercial designs to Admiralty specifications.

In 1940 the Royal Navy ordered ten such vessels from Cochrane. All saw active service, and two were lost in incidents.

Corncrake-type minelayer 
Two vessels, Mackerel and Turbot, were converted for use as controlled minelayers while still under construction. Upon completion they were renamed Corncrake and Redshank, respectively.

Ships

See also
 Trawlers of the Royal Navy

Notes

References
 
 Conway : Conway's All the World's Fighting Ships 1922–1946 (1980) 
Elliott, Peter: Allied Escort Ships of World War II (1977)

External links
 Fish class trawlers at uboat.net

Naval trawlers of the United Kingdom
Minelayers of the United Kingdom